Thomas Noble Oliver (January 15, 1903 – February 26, 1988) was a center fielder in Major League Baseball who played from  through to  for the Boston Red Sox. He was born in Montgomery, Alabama.

Oliver was a slap hitter who rarely tried to drive the ball. As an outfielder, his arm and speed were already well above average, while his graceful style prompted baseball historian Fred Lieb to compare him to Joe DiMaggio and Tris Speaker.

In his rookie season for Boston, Oliver led the American League in games played (154), outs (472) and at-bats (646), while hitting a career-high .293 and leading his team in runs (86), hits (186) and singles (153). He enjoyed another good season in 1931, when he hit .276 and posted career-numbers in doubles (35) and RBI (75). He also led his team in singles (122),  triples (5) and outs (436), and was considered in the American League MVP vote. The next two years he shared duties at center field with Dusty Cooke and Carl Reynolds.

In a four-season career, Oliver was a .277 hitter with 202 runs and 176 RBI in 514 games, including 191 doubles, 11 triples, 12 stolen bases, and a .316 on-base percentage without home runs. In 504 games at center field, he collected 1,425 outs with 45 assists and made 14 double plays, while committing 21 errors in 1,491 chances for a .986 fielding percentage.

Oliver holds the modern major league baseball record by going 1,931 at-bats without a home run in his career.

Oliver coached for the Philadelphia Athletics and Baltimore Orioles from 1951 to 1954. He also scouted for the Athletics, Philadelphia Phillies and the Washington Senators/Minnesota Twins. He died at the age of 85 in Montgomery.

A member of an athletic family, Oliver was the uncle of William Oliver "Whitey" Overton who ran track in the 1948 Olympics and the great uncle of William Oliver "Bill" Overton, Jr. who played representative rugby for five separate years for the Texas Rugby Union and club rugby for the Austin Huns Rugby Football Club from 1975 to 1984.

External links

Tom Oliver Baseball Biography - Baseballbiography.com
Retrosheet

1903 births
1988 deaths
Baltimore Orioles coaches
Baltimore Orioles scouts
Baltimore Orioles (IL) players
Baseball players from Montgomery, Alabama
Beaumont Exporters players
Boston Red Sox players
Columbus Red Birds players
Decatur Commodores players
Durham Bulls players
Knoxville Smokies players
Lancaster Red Roses players
Laurel Lumberjacks players
Little Rock Travelers players
Major League Baseball center fielders
Major League Baseball third base coaches
Minnesota Twins scouts
Mission Bells players
Monroe Drillers players
Montreal Royals players
Nashville Vols players
New Orleans Pelicans (baseball) players
Philadelphia Athletics coaches
Philadelphia Athletics scouts
Philadelphia Phillies scouts
Reading Chicks players
Shreveport Gassers players
Sportspeople from Montgomery, Alabama
Toronto Maple Leafs (International League) players
Vernon Tigers players
Washington Senators (1901–60) scouts
Wilmington Blue Rocks (1940–1952) players